The Baron de Hirsch Cemetery, also known as the Beth Israel Synagogue Cemetery, is a Jewish cemetery located on west side of Windsor Street at the intersection of Connaught Avenue beside Fairview Cemetery in the city of Halifax, Nova Scotia, Canada. It has been the burial ground of the congregation of the Beth Israel Synagogue of Halifax since 1893.

History 
The Baron De Hirsch Hebrew Benevolent Society, named for the philanthropist, Baron Maurice de Hirsch (1831–1896), of Munich, sought to acquire land on the outskirts of Halifax for a local cemetery. The Culvie Farm property was purchased for that purpose on 20 June 1893, and the land was consecrated on 30 July 1893. Some changes to the boundaries of the cemetery were negotiated with the city in the 1950s due to the city's need to realign Windsor Street. The city provided additional property, but some original memorial walls had to be disassembled and moved. The new wall was dedicated on 30 September 1968. An anonymous donor since 2004 has funded renovations and expansion.

RMS Titanic 
Of the 209 bodies recovered after the sinking of the RMS Titanic in April 1912, 150 were buried in Halifax cemeteries. Ten victims were buried at Baron de Hirsch Cemetery, eight of whom unidentified. The others were the Titanic's saloon steward Frederick William Wormald, passenger Michel Navratil and Leopold Weisz. While the intent was for Jewish victims to be buried in the cemetery based on initial body identification, it later turned out that the only two identified victims from Titanic in the cemetery were not Jewish. Wormald was Church of England and Navratil, who had boarded the ship under the name "Louis M. Hoffman", was Catholic.

The cemetery also contains a Commonwealth war grave of a Canadian soldier of World War I.

References

External links 
 Beth Israel Synagogue Cemetery website
 Titanica rendering of gravesites of Titanic victims
 Titanic burials
 The Jewish Traveler: The Maritimes, Hadassah Magazine
 

Cemeteries in Halifax, Nova Scotia
Jewish cemeteries in Canada
1893 establishments in Canada